Berezovo or Beryozovo is the name of several inhabited localities in Russia. The name is derived from the Russian береза (bereza), "birch."

Modern localities

Altai Krai
As of 2012, two rural localities in Altai Krai bear this name:
Berezovo, Soloneshensky District, Altai Krai, a selo in Lyutayevsky Selsoviet of Soloneshensky District; 
Berezovo, Soltonsky District, Altai Krai, a selo in Soltonsky Selsoviet of Soltonsky District;

Arkhangelsk Oblast
As of 2012, one rural locality in Arkhangelsk Oblast bears this name:
Berezovo, Arkhangelsk Oblast, a village in Shonoshsky Selsoviet of Velsky District

Belgorod Oblast
As of 2012, one rural locality in Belgorod Oblast bears this name:
Berezovo, Belgorod Oblast, a khutor in Belgorodsky District

Chelyabinsk Oblast
As of 2012, one rural locality in Chelyabinsk Oblast bears this name:
Berezovo, Chelyabinsk Oblast, a settlement in Berezovsky Selsoviet of Krasnoarmeysky District

Ivanovo Oblast
As of 2012, one rural locality in Ivanovo Oblast bears this name:
Berezovo, Ivanovo Oblast, a village in Vichugsky District

Kaliningrad Oblast
As of 2012, one rural locality in Kaliningrad Oblast bears this name:
Berezovo, Kaliningrad Oblast, a settlement under the administrative jurisdiction of the town of district significance of Pravdinsk in Pravdinsky District

Kaluga Oblast
As of 2012, one rural locality in Kaluga Oblast bears this name:
Berezovo, Kaluga Oblast, a village in Spas-Demensky District

Kemerovo Oblast
As of 2012, three rural localities in Kemerovo Oblast bear this name:
Berezovo, Kemerovsky District, Kemerovo Oblast, a selo in Berezovskaya Rural Territory of Kemerovsky District; 
Berezovo, Novokuznetsky District, Kemerovo Oblast, a selo in Kostenkovskaya Rural Territory of Novokuznetsky District; 
Berezovo, Promyshlennovsky District, Kemerovo Oblast, a selo in Padunskaya Rural Territory of Promyshlennovsky District;

Khanty-Mansi Autonomous Okrug
As of 2012, one urban locality in Khanty-Mansi Autonomous Okrug bears this name:
Beryozovo, Khanty-Mansi Autonomous Okrug, an urban-type settlement in Beryozovsky District

Kirov Oblast
As of 2012, one rural locality in Kirov Oblast bears this name:
Berezovo, Kirov Oblast, a selo in Ivanovsky Rural Okrug of Yuryansky District;

Kostroma Oblast
As of 2012, one rural locality in Kostroma Oblast bears this name:
Berezovo, Kostroma Oblast, a village in Orekhovskoye Settlement of Galichsky District;

Kurgan Oblast
As of 2012, three rural localities in Kurgan Oblast bear this name:
Berezovo, Belozersky District, Kurgan Oblast, a village in Bayaraksky Selsoviet of Belozersky District; 
Berezovo, Kurtamyshsky District, Kurgan Oblast, a selo in Bolsheberezovsky Selsoviet of Kurtamyshsky District; 
Berezovo, Shumikhinsky District, Kurgan Oblast, a selo in Berezovsky Selsoviet of Shumikhinsky District;

Kursk Oblast
As of 2012, one rural locality in Kursk Oblast bears this name:
Berezovo, Kursk Oblast, a selo in Sosnovsky Selsoviet of Gorshechensky District

Leningrad Oblast
As of 2012, one rural locality in Leningrad Oblast bears this name:
Berezovo, Leningrad Oblast, a settlement in Sevastyanovskoye Settlement Municipal Formation of Priozersky District;

Mari El Republic
As of 2012, two rural localities in the Mari El Republic bear this name:
Berezovo, Mikryakovsky Rural Okrug, Gornomariysky District, Mari El Republic, a village in Mikryakovsky Rural Okrug of Gornomariysky District
Berezovo, Paygusovsky Rural Okrug, Gornomariysky District, Mari El Republic, a village in Paygusovsky Rural Okrug of Gornomariysky District

Republic of Mordovia
As of 2012, one rural locality in the Republic of Mordovia bears this name:
Berezovo, Republic of Mordovia, a settlement in Krasnoyarsky Selsoviet of Tengushevsky District;

Nizhny Novgorod Oblast
As of 2012, one rural locality in Nizhny Novgorod Oblast bears this name:
Berezovo, Nizhny Novgorod Oblast, a village in Loyminsky Selsoviet of Sokolsky District

Novosibirsk Oblast
As of 2012, one rural locality in Novosibirsk Oblast bears this name:
Berezovo, Novosibirsk Oblast, a selo in Maslyaninsky District

Omsk Oblast
As of 2012, one rural locality in Omsk Oblast bears this name:
Berezovo, Omsk Oblast, a village in Kiterminsky Rural Okrug of Krutinsky District

Perm Krai
As of 2012, three rural localities in Perm Krai bear this name:
Berezovo, Cherdynsky District, Perm Krai, a village in Cherdynsky District
Berezovo, Kungursky District, Perm Krai, a village in Kungursky District
Berezovo, Ochyorsky District, Perm Krai, a village in Ochyorsky District

Pskov Oblast
As of 2012, two rural localities in Pskov Oblast bear this name:
Berezovo, Dedovichsky District, Pskov Oblast, a village in Dedovichsky District
Berezovo, Nevelsky District, Pskov Oblast, a village in Nevelsky District

Ryazan Oblast
As of 2012, five rural localities in Ryazan Oblast bear this name:
Berezovo, Klepikovsky District, Ryazan Oblast, a village in Busayevsky Rural Okrug of Klepikovsky District
Berezovo, Mikhaylovsky District, Ryazan Oblast, a selo in Pechernikovsky Rural Okrug of Mikhaylovsky District
Berezovo, Pronsky District, Ryazan Oblast, a selo in Berezovsky Rural Okrug of Pronsky District
Berezovo, Ryazhsky District, Ryazan Oblast, a selo in Marchukovsky 2 Rural Okrug of Ryazhsky District
Berezovo, Shilovsky District, Ryazan Oblast, a selo in Berezovsky Rural Okrug of Shilovsky District

Saratov Oblast
As of 2012, one rural locality in Saratov Oblast bears this name:
Berezovo, Saratov Oblast, a selo in Pugachyovsky District

Sverdlovsk Oblast
As of 2012, one rural locality in Sverdlovsk Oblast bears this name:
Berezovo, Sverdlovsk Oblast, a village in Lensky Selsoviet of Turinsky District

Tula Oblast
As of 2012, five rural localities in Tula Oblast bear this name:
Berezovo, Belyovsky District, Tula Oblast, a village in Berezovsky Rural Okrug of Belyovsky District
Berezovo, Dubensky District, Tula Oblast, a village in Protasovsky Rural Okrug of Dubensky District
Berezovo, Odoyevsky District, Tula Oblast, a selo in Berezovskaya Rural Administration of Odoyevsky District
Berezovo, Suvorovsky District, Tula Oblast, a selo in Berezovskaya Rural Territory of Suvorovsky District
Berezovo, Venyovsky District, Tula Oblast, a selo in Povetkinsky Rural Okrug of Venyovsky District

Tver Oblast
As of 2012, two rural localities in Tver Oblast bear this name:
Berezovo, Andreapolsky District, Tver Oblast, a village in Andreapolskoye Rural Settlement of Andreapolsky District
Berezovo, Ostashkovsky District, Tver Oblast, a village in Svyatoselskoye Rural Settlement of Ostashkovsky District

Vologda Oblast
As of 2012, six rural localities in Vologda Oblast bear this name:
Berezovo, Belozersky District, Vologda Oblast, a village in Antushevsky Selsoviet of Belozersky District
Berezovo, Kirillovsky District, Vologda Oblast, a village in Charozersky Selsoviet of Kirillovsky District
Berezovo, Permassky Selsoviet, Nikolsky District, Vologda Oblast, a village in Permassky Selsoviet of Nikolsky District
Berezovo, Zelentsovsky Selsoviet, Nikolsky District, Vologda Oblast, a village in Zelentsovsky Selsoviet of Nikolsky District
Berezovo, Nyuksensky District, Vologda Oblast, a village in Berezovsky Selsoviet of Nyuksensky District
Berezovo, Velikoustyugsky District, Vologda Oblast, a village in Nizhneyerogodsky Selsoviet of Velikoustyugsky District

Voronezh Oblast
As of 2012, five rural localities in Voronezh Oblast bear this name:
Berezovo, Liskinsky District, Voronezh Oblast, a khutor in Stepnyanskoye Rural Settlement of Liskinsky District
Berezovo, Ostrogozhsky District, Voronezh Oblast, a selo in Berezovskoye Rural Settlement of Ostrogozhsky District
Berezovo, Pavlovsky District, Voronezh Oblast, a selo in Peskovskoye Rural Settlement of Pavlovsky District
Berezovo, Podgorensky District, Voronezh Oblast, a selo in Berezovskoye Rural Settlement of Podgorensky District
Berezovo, Ramonsky District, Voronezh Oblast, a selo in Berezovskoye Rural Settlement of Ramonsky District

Zabaykalsky Krai
As of 2012, one rural locality in Zabaykalsky Krai bears this name:
Berezovo, Zabaykalsky Krai, a selo in Nerchinsky District

Alternative names
Berezovo, alternative name of Verkhneberezovo, a village in Berezovsky Selsoviet of Pritobolny District in Kurgan Oblast; 
Berezovo, alternative name of Berezovka, a selo in Berezovsky Selsoviet of Krasnogorsky District in Altai Krai; 
Berezovo, alternative name of Nizhneberezovo, a selo in Berezovsky Selsoviet of Pritobolny District in Kurgan Oblast;

Former localities
 Beryozovo, Chukotka Autonomous Okrug, abandoned selo in Anadyrsky District of Chukotka Autonomous Okrug

References